"A Green New Deal" was a report released in the United Kingdom on 21 July 2008 by the Green New Deal Group and published by the New Economics Foundation, which outlines a series of policy proposals to tackle global warming, the current financial crisis, and peak oil. The report calls for the re-regulation of finance and taxation, and major government investment in renewable energy sources. Its full title is: A Green New Deal: Joined-up policies to solve the triple crunch of the credit crisis, climate change and high oil prices.

Recommendations 
 Government-led investment in energy efficiency and microgeneration which would make 'every building a powerstation'.
 The creation of thousands of green jobs to enable low-carbon infrastructure reconstruction.
 A windfall tax on the profits of oil and gas companies - as has been established in Norway - so as to provide revenue for government spending on renewable energy and energy efficiency.
 Developing financial incentives for green investment and reduced energy usage.
 Changes to the UK's financial system, including the reduction of the Bank of England's interest rate, once again to support green investment.
 Large financial institutions - 'mega banks' - to be broken up into smaller units and green banking.
 The re-regulation of international finance: ensuring that the financial sector does not dominate the rest of the economy. This would involve the re-introduction of capital controls.
 Increased official scrutiny of exotic financial products such as derivatives.
 The prevention of corporate tax evasion by demanding financial reporting and by clamping down on tax havens.

In the UK 
Although the politicians have used the term Green New Deal, it remains largely unimplemented in the form that it was originally proposed. Larry Elliott, the Guardian newspaper's economics editor and one of the originators of the idea, wrote in 2020 that perhaps the policy might be first trialled "in one of the UK’s big cities – Manchester or Glasgow, say – to see whether a GND creates jobs, cuts emissions and generates a new wave of profitable environmental innovation".

Authors 

The authors of "A Green New Deal" are:
 Larry Elliott, economics editor of The Guardian
 Colin Hines, co-director of Finance for the Future
 Tony Juniper, former director of Friends of the Earth
 Jeremy Leggett, founder and chairman of Solarcentury and SolarAid
 Caroline Lucas, Member of Parliament for Brighton Pavilion, former leader of the Green Party of England and Wales, and former Member of the European Parliament 
 Richard Murphy, co-director of Finance for the Future and director of Tax Research LLP
 Ann Pettifor, former head of the Jubilee 2000 debt relief campaign and campaign director of Operation Noah
 Charles Secrett, advisor on sustainable development, former director of Friends of the Earth
 Andrew Simms, policy director of the New Economics Foundation

See also 
 Climate change mitigation
 Green growth
 Politics of global warming
 Sustainable Development Commission

References

External links
 Full text of A Green New Deal from the New Economics Foundation
 The Green New Deal Group
 UNEP Global Green New Deal
 Caroline Lucas on A Green New Deal at the Guardian
 A green New Deal: Green, easy and wrong, article at The Economist
 Support the Green New Deal for Europe
 Labour members launch Green New Deal inspired by US activists. Author - Matthew Taylor. Published by The Guardian on 22 March 2019.

Environmental policy
2000s economic history
Low-carbon economy
Climate change mass media